is a Japanese voice actor and singer who is a vocalist in the Japanese rock band Virgil. He also voices Tobi in Blood Lad.

References

External links 
 Virgil website
 Official blog

1979 births
Living people
Japanese male rock singers
Japanese male voice actors
21st-century Japanese male actors
21st-century Japanese singers
21st-century Japanese male singers